Romance is a 1930 American Pre-Code Metro-Goldwyn-Mayer film directed by Clarence Brown, starring Greta Garbo, Lewis Stone, and Gavin Gordon.

The movie was adapted by Edwin Justus Mayer and Bess Meredyth from the 1913 play by Edward Sheldon. A 1920 silent film also called Romance was one of the first releases by then new United Artists and starred Doris Keane, the actress in Sheldon's 1913 play.

Plot
On New Year's Eve, Harry (Elliott Nugent) tells his grandfather (Gavin Gordon), a bishop, that he intends to marry an actress, even though that is frowned upon by his social class. However, his grandfather recounts via flashback a cautionary tale of a great love affair with a "fallen woman" during his own youth.

When he is 28 years old, Tom Armstrong, the son of an aristocratic family and the rector of St. Giles, meets the famous Italian opera star Rita Cavallini (Greta Garbo) at an evening party given by Cornelius Van Tuyl (Lewis Stone). Tom falls in love with Rita even though there are rumors that she is Van Tuyl's mistress. Tom's family disapproves of Rita, but he continues to pursue her until he discovers that she has been lying to him about the true nature of her relationship with Van Tuyl. Though he forgives and loves her, their different lives and different social classes make an engagement untenable. Ultimately, Tom marries Harry's grandmother.

In a surprise ending, he counsels Harry to marry the woman he loves, regardless of the consequences.

Cast

 Greta Garbo as Rita Cavallini
 Lewis Stone as Cornelius Van Tuyl
 Gavin Gordon as Tom Armstrong
 Elliott Nugent as Harry
 Florence Lake as Susan Van Tuyl
 Clara Blandick as Abigail Armstrong
 Henry Armetta as Beppo
 Mathilde Comont as Vannucci
 Rina De Liguoro as Nina (credited as Countess De Liguoro)

Reception
Mordaunt Hall of The New York Times wrote that "Greta Garbo's performance in Romance is perhaps as good as anything she has done on the screen." Norbert Lusk of the movie magazine Picture Play wrote that Garbo's performance "is a thing of pure beauty, an inspiring blend of intellect and emotion, a tender, poignant, poetic portrait of a woman who thrusts love from her because she considers herself unworthy of the man who offers it."

Romance cost $496,000 and grossed $733,000 in the United States and $523,000 in other markets, the worldwide gross was $1,256,000, and it made a profit of $287,000.

Academy Awards
Nominations
 Best Director: Clarence Brown
 Best Actress: Greta Garbo

References

External links
 
 
 
 

1930 films
1930 romantic drama films
American black-and-white films
American romantic drama films
Films based on works by Edward Sheldon
Films directed by Clarence Brown
Metro-Goldwyn-Mayer films
Films with screenplays by Bess Meredyth
1930s English-language films
1930s American films